The Dead Sea Scrolls (also the Qumran Caves Scrolls) are ancient Jewish and Hebrew religious manuscripts discovered between 1946 and 1956 at the Qumran Caves in what was then Mandatory Palestine, near Ein Feshkha in the West Bank, on the northern shore of the Dead Sea. Dating from the 3rd century BCE to the 1st century CE, the Dead Sea Scrolls are considered to be a keystone in the history of archaeology with great historical, religious, and linguistic significance because they include the oldest surviving manuscripts of entire books later included in the biblical canons, along with deuterocanonical and extra-biblical manuscripts which preserve evidence of the diversity of religious thought in late Second Temple Judaism. At the same time they cast new light on the emergence of Christianity and of Rabbinic Judaism. Most of the scrolls are held by Israel in the Shrine of the Book at the Israel Museum, but their ownership is disputed by Jordan due to the Qumran Caves' history: following the End of the British Mandate for Palestine in 1947, Jordan occupied the area in the 1948 Arab–Israeli War, and Israel captured both the area and several Scrolls from Jordan in the 1967 Six Day War. However, some of the scrolls are still in Jordan and are now displayed at The Jordan Museum in Amman. Ownership of the scrolls is also contested by the State of Palestine.

Many thousands of written fragments have been discovered in the Dead Sea area. They represent the remnants of larger manuscripts damaged by natural causes or through human interference, with the vast majority holding only small scraps of text. However, a small number of well-preserved, almost intact manuscripts have survived – fewer than a dozen among those from the Qumran Caves. Researchers have assembled a collection of 981 different manuscripts – discovered in 1946/47 and in 1956 – from 11 caves. The 11 Qumran Caves lie in the immediate vicinity of the Hellenistic-period Jewish settlement at Khirbet Qumran in the eastern Judaean Desert, in the West Bank. Archaeologists have long associated the scrolls with the ancient Jewish sect called the Essenes, although some recent interpretations have challenged this connection and argue that priests in Jerusalem, or Zadokites, or other unknown Jewish groups wrote the scrolls.

Most of the texts are Hebrew, with some written in Aramaic (for example the Son of God Text; in different regional dialects, including Nabataean), and a few in Greek. Discoveries from the Judaean Desert add Latin (from Masada) and Arabic (from Khirbet al-Mird) texts. Most of the texts are written on parchment, some on papyrus, and one on copper. Scholarly consensus dates the scrolls from the last three centuries BCE and the first century CE, though manuscripts from associated Judaean Desert sites are dated as early as the 8th century BCE and as late as the 11th century CE. Bronze coins found at the same sites form a series beginning with John Hyrcanus (in office 135–104 BCE) and continuing until the period of the First Jewish–Roman War (66–73 CE), supporting the radiocarbon and paleographic dating of the scrolls.

Owing to the poor condition of some of the scrolls, scholars have not identified all of their texts. The identified texts fall into three general groups:
 About 40% are copies of texts from the Hebrew Scriptures.
 Approximately another 30% are texts from the Second Temple period which ultimately were not canonized in the Hebrew Bible, like the Book of Enoch, the Book of Jubilees, the Book of Tobit, the Wisdom of Sirach, Psalms 152–155, etc.
 The remainder (roughly 30%) are sectarian manuscripts of previously unknown documents that shed light on the rules and beliefs of a particular group (sect) or groups within greater Judaism, like the Community Rule, the War Scroll, the Pesher on Habakkuk, and The Rule of the Blessing.

Discovery

The Dead Sea Scrolls were discovered in a series of 12 caves around the site originally known as the Ein Feshkha Caves near the Dead Sea in the West Bank (then part of Jordan) between 1946 and 1956 by Bedouin shepherds and a team of archeologists. The practice of storing worn-out sacred manuscripts in earthenware vessels buried in the earth or within caves is related to the ancient Jewish custom of genizah.

Initial discovery (1946–1947)
The initial discovery by Bedouin shepherd Muhammed edh-Dhib, his cousin Jum'a Muhammed, and Khalil Musa took place between November 1946 and February 1947. The shepherds discovered seven scrolls  housed in jars in a cave near what is now known as the Qumran site. John C. Trever reconstructed the story of the scrolls from several interviews with the Bedouin. Edh-Dhib's cousin noticed the caves, but edh-Dhib himself was the first to actually fall into one (the cave now called Cave 1). He retrieved a handful of scrolls, which Trever identifies as the Isaiah Scroll, Habakkuk Commentary, and the Community Rule, and took them back to the camp to show to his family. None of the scrolls were destroyed in this process. The Bedouin kept the scrolls hanging on a tent pole while they contemplated what they should do with them, periodically showing the scrolls to their people. At some point during this time, the Community Rule was split in two. The Bedouin first took the scrolls to a dealer named Ibrahim 'Ijha in Bethlehem. 'Ijha returned them, saying they were worthless, after being warned that they might have been stolen from a synagogue. Undaunted, the Bedouin went to a nearby market, where a Syrian Christian offered to buy them. A sheikh joined their conversation and suggested that they take the scrolls to Khalil Eskander Shahin, "Kando", a cobbler and part-time antiques dealer. The Bedouin and the dealers returned to the site, leaving one scroll with Kando and selling three others to a dealer for seven Jordanian pounds (approximately $28, or $ in  dollars). The original scrolls continued to change hands after the Bedouin left them in the possession of a third party until a sale could be arranged. 

In 1947 the original seven scrolls caught the attention of John C. Trever of the American Schools of Oriental Research (ASOR), who compared the script in the scrolls to that of the Nash Papyrus, the oldest biblical manuscript then known, and found similarities between them. In March the 1948 Arab–Israeli War prompted the move of some of the scrolls to Beirut, Lebanon for safekeeping. On 11 April 1948, Millar Burrows, head of the ASOR, announced the discovery of the scrolls in a general press release.

Search for the Qumran caves (1948–1949)
Early in September 1948, Metropolitan bishop Mar Samuel brought some additional scroll fragments that he had acquired to professor Ovid R. Sellers, the new director of ASOR. By the end of 1948, nearly two years after the discovery of the scrolls, scholars had yet to locate the original cave where the fragments had been found. With unrest in the country at that time, no large-scale search could be safely undertaken. Sellers tried to persuade the Syrians to assist in the search for the cave, but he was unable to pay their price. In early 1949, the government of Jordan granted permission to the Arab Legion to search the area in which the original Qumran cave was believed to exist. Consequently, Cave 1 was rediscovered on 28 January 1949 by Belgian United Nations observer captain Phillipe Lippens and Arab Legion captain Akkash el-Zebn.

Qumran caves rediscovery and new scroll discoveries (1949–1951)

The rediscovery of what became known as Cave 1 at Qumran prompted the initial excavation of the site from 15 February to 5 March 1949 by the Jordanian Department of Antiquities, led by Gerald Lankester Harding and Roland de Vaux. The Cave 1 site yielded discoveries of additional Dead Sea Scroll fragments, linen cloth, jars, and other artifacts.

Excavations of Qumran and new cave discoveries (1951–1956, 2017, 2021)
In November 1951, Roland de Vaux and his team from the ASOR began a full excavation of Qumran. By February 1952, the Bedouin had discovered 30 fragments in what was to be designated Cave 2. The discovery of a second cave eventually yielded 300 fragments from 33 manuscripts, including fragments of Jubilees and the Wisdom of Sirach written in Hebrew. The following month, on 14 March 1952, the ASOR team discovered a third cave with fragments of Jubilees and the Copper Scroll. Between September and December 1952, the fragments and scrolls of Caves 4, 5, and 6 were discovered by the ASOR teams.

With the monetary value of the scrolls rising as their historical significance was made more public, the Bedouins and the ASOR archaeologists accelerated their search for the scrolls separately in the same general area of Qumran, which was more than one kilometer in length. Between 1953 and 1956, de Vaux led four more archaeological expeditions in the area to uncover scrolls and artifacts. Cave 11 was discovered in 1956 and yielded the last fragments to be found in the vicinity of Qumran.

Caves 4–10 are clustered in an area lying in relative proximity  from Khirbet Qumran, while caves 1, 2, 3 and 11 are located 1 mile (1–2 kilometres) north, with Cave 3 the most remote.

In February 2017, Hebrew University archaeologists announced the discovery of a new 12th cave. There was one blank parchment found in a jar, but broken and empty scroll jars and pickaxes suggest that the cave was looted in the 1950s.

In March 2021, Israeli archaeologists announced the discovery of dozens of fragments bearing biblical text, written in Greek, from the books of Zechariah and Nahum. This group of findings is believed to have been hidden in a cave between 132 and 136 CE during the Bar Kokhba revolt. However, a 10,500-year-old basket hewn of woven reeds was also discovered in the Muraba'at caves in the Nahal Darga Reserve. Other discoveries included the remains of a child wrapped in cloth dated to around 6,000 years ago, and a cache of coins from the days of the Bar Kochba revolt.

In 2021, more scrolls were discovered by Israeli authorities in a different cave near the Dead Sea called the Cave of Horror.

Scrolls and fragments

The 972 manuscripts found at Qumran were found primarily in two separate formats: as scrolls and as fragments of previous scrolls and texts. In the fourth cave the fragments were torn into up to 15,000 pieces. These small fragments created somewhat of a problem for scholars. G.L. Harding, director of the Jordanian Department of Antiquities, began working on piecing the fragments together but did not finish this before his death in 1979.

Cave 1

The original seven scrolls from Cave 1 at Qumran are the Great Isaiah Scroll (1QIsaa), a second copy of Isaiah (1QIsab), the Community Rule Scroll (1QS), the Pesher Habakkuk (1QpHab), the War Scroll (1QM), the Thanksgiving Hymns (1QH), and the Genesis Apocryphon (1QapGen).

Cave 2

Cave 3

Caves 4a and 4b 

Cave 4 was discovered in August 1952, and was excavated on 22–29 September 1952 by Gerald Lankester Harding, Roland de Vaux, and Józef Milik. Cave 4 is actually two hand-cut caves (4a and 4b), but since the fragments were mixed, they are labeled as 4Q. Cave 4 is important both because of its visibility from the Qumran plateau and its productivity. It is visible from the plateau to the south of the Qumran settlement. It is by far the most productive of all Qumran caves, producing ninety percent of the Dead Sea Scrolls and scroll fragments (approx. 15,000 fragments from 500 different texts), including 9–10 copies of Jubilees, along with 21 tefillin and 7 mezuzot.

Cave 5 

Cave 5 was discovered alongside Cave 6 in 1952, shortly after the discovery of Cave 4. Cave 5 produced approximately 25 manuscripts.

Cave 6 

Cave 6 was discovered alongside Cave 5 in 1952, shortly after the discovery of Cave 4. Cave 6 contained fragments of about 31 manuscripts.

List of groups of fragments collected from Wadi Qumran Cave 6:

Cave 7 

Cave 7 yielded fewer than 20 fragments of Greek documents, including 7Q2 (the "Letter of Jeremiah" = Baruch 6), 7Q5 (which became the subject of much speculation in later decades), and a Greek copy of a scroll of Enoch. Cave 7 also produced several inscribed potsherds and jars.

Lists of groups of fragments collected from Wadi Qumran Cave 7:

Cave 8 

Cave 8, along with caves 7 and 9, was one of the only caves that are accessible by passing through the settlement at Qumran. Carved into the southern end of the Qumran plateau, cave 8 was excavated by archaeologists in 1957.

Cave 8 produced five fragments: Genesis (8QGen), Psalms (8QPs), a tefillin fragment (8QPhyl), a mezuzah (8QMez), and a hymn (8QHymn). Cave 8 also produced several tefillin cases, a box of leather objects, tons of lamps, jars, and the sole of a leather shoe.

List of groups of fragments collected from Wadi Qumran Cave 8:

Cave 9 

Cave 9, along with caves 7 and 8, was one of the only caves that are accessible by passing through the settlement at Qumran. Carved into the southern end of the Qumran plateau, Cave 9 was excavated by archaeologists in 1957. There was only one fragment found in Cave 9.

Cave 10 

In Cave 10 archaeologists found two ostraca with writing on them, along with an unknown symbol on a grey stone slab.

Cave 11 

Cave 11 was discovered in 1956 and yielded 21 texts, some of which were quite long. The Temple Scroll, so called because more than half of it pertains to the construction of the Temple of Jerusalem, was found in Cave 11, and is by far the longest scroll. It is now 26.7 feet (8.15 m) long. Its original length may have been over 28 feet (8.75 m). The Temple Scroll was regarded by Yigael Yadin as "The Torah According to the Essenes". On the other hand, Hartmut Stegemann, a contemporary and friend of Yadin, believed the scroll was not to be regarded as such, but was a document without exceptional significance. Stegemann notes that it is not mentioned or cited in any known Essene writing.

Also in Cave 11, an eschatological fragment about the biblical figure Melchizedek (11Q13) was found. Cave 11 also produced a copy of Jubilees, and a proto-Masoteric text of the Torah scroll (only a fragment of the Book of Leviticus surviving), known as the Paleo-Hebrew Leviticus Scroll.

According to former chief editor of the Dead Sea Scroll editorial team John Strugnell, there are at least four privately owned scrolls from Cave 11, that have not yet been made available for scholars. Among them is a complete Aramaic manuscript of the Book of Enoch.

List of groups of fragments collected from Wadi Qumran Cave 11:

Cave 12
Cave 12 was discovered in February 2017 on cliffs west of Qumran, near the northwestern shore of the Dead Sea. Archaeological examination found pickaxes and empty broken scroll jars, indicating that the cave had been discovered and looted in the 1950s. One of the joint Hebrew University of Jerusalem and Liberty University of Virginia project's lead researchers, Dr. Oren Gutfeld, stated, "Although at the end of the day no scroll was found, and instead we 'only' found a piece of parchment rolled up in a jug that was being processed for writing, the findings indicate beyond any doubt that the cave contained scrolls that were stolen."

Fragments with unknown provenance
Some fragments of scrolls have neither significant archaeological provenance nor records that reveal in which designated Qumran cave area they were found. They are believed to have come from Wadi Qumran caves, but are just as likely to have come from other archaeological sites in the Judaean Desert area. These fragments have therefore been designated to the temporary "X" series.

Gallery

Origin
There has been much debate about the origin of the Dead Sea Scrolls. The dominant theory remains that the scrolls were produced by the Essenes, a sect of Jews living at nearby Qumran, but this theory has come to be challenged by several modern scholars.

Qumran–Essene theory

The view among scholars, almost universally held until the 1990s, is the "Qumran–Essene" hypothesis originally posited by Roland Guérin de Vaux and Józef Tadeusz Milik, though independently both Eliezer Sukenik and Butrus Sowmy of St Mark's Monastery connected scrolls with the Essenes well before any excavations at Qumran. The Qumran–Essene theory holds that the scrolls were written by the Essenes, or by another Jewish sectarian group, residing at Khirbet Qumran. They composed the scrolls and ultimately hid them in the nearby caves during the Jewish Revolt sometime between 66 and 68 CE. The site of Qumran was destroyed and the scrolls never recovered.
A number of arguments are used to support this theory.
 There are striking similarities between the description of an initiation ceremony of new members in the Community Rule and descriptions of the Essene initiation ceremony mentioned in the works of Flavius Josephus – a Jewish–Roman historian of the Second Temple period.
 Josephus mentions the Essenes as sharing property among the members of the community, as does the Community Rule.
 During the excavation of Khirbet Qumran, two inkwells and plastered elements thought to be tables were found, offering evidence that some form of writing was done there. More inkwells were discovered nearby. De Vaux called this area the "scriptorium" based upon this discovery.
 Several Jewish ritual baths were discovered at Qumran, offering evidence of an observant Jewish presence at the site.
 Pliny the Elder (a geographer writing after the fall of Jerusalem in 70 CE) describes a group of Essenes living in a desert community on the northwest shore of the Dead Sea near the ruined town of 'Ein Gedi.

Qumran–Sectarian theory
Qumran–Sectarian theories are variations on the Qumran–Essene theory. The main point of departure from the Qumran–Essene theory is hesitation to link the Dead Sea Scrolls specifically with the Essenes. Most proponents of the Qumran–Sectarian theory understand a group of Jews living in or near Qumran to be responsible for the Dead Sea Scrolls, but do not necessarily conclude that the sectarians are Essenes.

A specific variation on the Qumran–Sectarian theory emerged in the 1990s that has gained much recent popularity is the work of Lawrence H. Schiffman, who proposes that the community was led by a group of Zadokite priests (Sadducees). The most important document in support of this view is the "Miqsat Ma'ase Ha-Torah" (4QMMT), which cites purity laws (such as the transfer of impurities) identical to those attributed in rabbinic writings to the Sadducees. 4QMMT also reproduces a festival calendar that follows Sadducee principles for the dating of certain festival days.

Christian origin theory
Spanish Jesuit José O'Callaghan Martínez argued in the 1960s that one fragment (7Q5) preserves a portion of text from the New Testament Gospel of Mark 6:52–53. This theory was scrutinized in the year 2000 by paleographic analysis of the particular fragment. However, this faced some contention, and O'Callaghan's theory remains an area of great dispute. Later analyses in 2004 and 2018 lent credence to O'Callaghan's original assertion.

Robert Eisenman has advanced the theory that some scrolls describe the early Christian community. Eisenman also argued that the careers of James the Just and Paul the Apostle correspond to events recorded in some of these documents.

Jerusalem origin theory
Some scholars have argued that the scrolls were the product of Jews living in Jerusalem, who hid the scrolls in the caves near Qumran while fleeing from the Romans during the destruction of Jerusalem in 70 CE. Karl Heinrich Rengstorf first proposed in the 1960s that the Dead Sea Scrolls originated at the library of the Jewish Temple in Jerusalem. Later, Norman Golb suggested that the scrolls were the product of multiple libraries in Jerusalem, and not necessarily the Jerusalem Temple library. Proponents of the Jerusalem origin theory point to the diversity of thought and handwriting among the scrolls as evidence against a Qumran origin of the scrolls. Several archaeologists have also accepted an origin of the scrolls other than Qumran, including Yizhar Hirschfeld and more recently Yizhak Magen and Yuval Peleg,<ref>{{cite web |first1=Magen |last1=Yizhak |first2=Yuval |last2=Peleg |title=The Qumran Excavations 1993–2004: Preliminary Report, JSP 6 |publisher=Jerusalem: Israel Antiquities Authority |year=2007 |url=http://www.antiquities.org.il/images/shop/jsp/JSP6_Qumran_color.pdf |access-date=7 November 2007 |archive-url=https://web.archive.org/web/20071128071000/http://www.antiquities.org.il/images/shop/jsp/JSP6_Qumran_color.pdf |archive-date=28 November 2007 |url-status=live }}</ref> who all understand the remains of Qumran to be those of a Hasmonean fort that was reused during later periods.

Physical characteristics

Radiocarbon dating

Parchment from a number of the Dead Sea Scrolls has been carbon dated. The initial test performed in 1950 was on a piece of linen from one of the caves. This test gave an indicative dating of 33 CE plus or minus 200 years, eliminating early hypotheses relating the scrolls to the medieval period. Since then two large series of tests have been performed on the scrolls themselves. The results were summarized by VanderKam and Flint, who said the tests give "strong reason for thinking that most of the Qumran manuscripts belong to the last two centuries BCE and the first century CE."

Paleographic dating
Analysis of letter forms, or palaeography, was applied to the texts of the Dead Sea Scrolls by a variety of scholars in the field. Major linguistic analysis by Cross and Avigad dates fragments from 225 BCE to 50 CE. These dates were determined by examining the size, variability, and style of the text. The same fragments were later analyzed using radiocarbon dating and were dated to an estimated range of 385 BCE to 82 CE with a 68% accuracy rate.

Ink and parchment
The scrolls were analyzed using a cyclotron at the University of California, Davis, where it was found that all black ink was carbon black. The red ink on the scrolls was found to be made with cinnabar (HgS, mercury sulfide). There are only four uses of this red ink in the entire collection of Dead Sea Scroll fragments. The black inks found on the scrolls are mostly made of carbon soot from olive oil lamps. Honey, oil, vinegar, and water were often added to the mixture to thin the ink to a proper consistency for writing. Galls were sometimes added to the ink to make it more resilient. In order to apply the ink to the scrolls, its writers used reed pens.

The Dead Sea Scrolls were written on parchment made of processed animal hide known as vellum (approximately 85.5–90.5% of the scrolls), papyrus (estimated at 8–13% of the scrolls), and sheets of bronze composed of about 99% copper and 1% tin (approximately 1.5% of the scrolls).McFarlane, Callie. A Clear Destiny. p. 126. 2011. For those scrolls written on animal hides, scholars with the Israeli Antiquities Authority, by use of DNA testing for assembly purposes, believe that there may be a hierarchy in the religious importance of the texts based on which type of animal was used to create the hide. Scrolls written on goat and calf hides are considered by scholars to be more significant in nature, while those written on gazelle or ibex are considered to be less religiously significant in nature.

In addition, tests by the National Institute of Nuclear Physics in Sicily, Italy, have suggested that the origin of parchment of select Dead Sea Scroll fragments is from the Qumran area itself, by using X-ray and Particle-induced X-ray emission testing of the water used to make the parchment that were compared with the water from the area around the Qumran site.

Preservation

The Dead Sea Scrolls that were found were originally preserved by the dry, arid, and low humidity conditions present within the Qumran area adjoining the Dead Sea. In addition, the lack of the use of tanning materials on the parchment of the Dead Sea Scrolls and the very low airflow in the Qumran caves also contributed significantly to their preservation. Some of the scrolls were found stored in clay jars within the Qumran caves, further helping to preserve them from deterioration. The original handling of the scrolls by archaeologists and scholars was done inappropriately, and, along with their storage in an uncontrolled environment, they began a process of more rapid deterioration than they had experienced at Qumran. During the first few years in the late 1940s and early 1950s, adhesive tape used to join fragments and seal cracks caused significant damage to the documents. The government of Jordan had recognized the urgency of protecting the scrolls from deterioration and the presence of the deterioration among the scrolls. However, the government did not have adequate funds to purchase all the scrolls for their protection and agreed to have foreign institutions purchase the scrolls and have them held at their museum in Jerusalem until they could be "adequately studied".

In early 1953, they were moved to the Palestine Archaeological Museum (commonly called the Rockefeller Museum) in East Jerusalem and through their transportation suffered more deterioration and damage. The museum was underfunded and had limited resources with which to examine the scrolls, and, as a result, conditions of the "scrollery" and storage area were left relatively uncontrolled by modern standards. The museum had left most of the fragments and scrolls lying between window glass, trapping the moisture in with them, causing an acceleration in the deterioration process. During a portion of the conflict during the 1956 war waged by Israel, Britain and France against Egypt, the scrolls collection of the Palestine Archaeological Museum was stored in the vault of the Ottoman Bank in Amman, Jordan. Damp conditions from temporary storage of the scrolls in the Ottoman Bank vault from 1956 to the Spring of 1957 led to a more rapid rate of deterioration of the scrolls. The conditions caused mildew to develop on the scrolls and fragments, and some fragments were partially destroyed or made illegible by the glue and paper of the manila envelopes in which they were stored while in the vault. By 1958 it was noted that up to 5% of some of the scrolls had completely deteriorated. Many of the texts had become illegible and many of the parchments had darkened considerably.

Until the 1970s, the scrolls continued to deteriorate because of poor storage arrangements, exposure to different adhesives, and being trapped in moist environments. Fragments written on parchment (rather than papyrus or bronze) in the hands of private collectors and scholars suffered an even worse fate than those in the hands of the museum, with large portions of fragments being reported to have disappeared by 1966. In the late 1960s, the deterioration was becoming a major concern with scholars and museum officials alike. Scholars John Allegro and Sir Francis Frank were among the first to strongly advocate for better preservation techniques. Early attempts made by both the British and Israel Museums to remove the adhesive tape ended up exposing the parchment to an array of chemicals, including "British Leather Dressing," and darkening some of them significantly. In the 1970s and 1980s, other preservation attempts were made that included removing the glass plates and replacing them with cardboard and removing pressure against the plates that held the scrolls in storage; however, the fragments and scrolls continued to rapidly deteriorate during this time.

In 1991, the Israeli Antiquities Authority established a temperature-controlled laboratory for the storage and preservation of the scrolls. The actions and preservation methods of Rockefeller Museum staff were concentrated on the removal of tape, oils, metals, salt, and other contaminants. The fragments and scrolls are preserved using acid-free cardboard and stored in solander boxes in the climate-controlled storage area.

Nine tiny phylactery slips were rediscovered by the Israel Antiquities Authority (IAA) in 2014, after they had been stored unopened for six decades following their excavation in 1952. The IAA is preparing to unroll the phylacteries or tefillin once a safe procedure has been decided upon.

Photography and assembly
Since the Dead Sea Scrolls were initially held by different parties during and after the excavation process, they were not all photographed by the same organization.

First photographs by the American Schools of Oriental Research (1948)
The first individual person to photograph a portion of the collection was John C. Trever (1916–2006), a biblical scholar and archaeologist, who was a resident for the American Schools of Oriental Research. He photographed three of the scrolls discovered in Cave 1 on 21 February 1948, both on black-and-white and standard color film. Although an amateur photographer, the quality of his photographs often exceeded the visibility of the scrolls themselves as, over the years, the ink of the texts quickly deteriorated after they were removed from their linen wrappings.

Infrared photography and plate assembly by the Palestine Archaeological Museum (1952–1967)
A majority of the collection from the Qumran caves was acquired by the Palestine Archaeological Museum. The museum had the scrolls photographed by Najib Albina, a local Arab photographer trained by Lewis Larsson of the American Colony in Jerusalem, Between 1952 and 1967, Albina documented the five-stage process of the sorting and assembly of the scrolls, done by the curator and staff of the Palestine Archaeological Museum, using infrared photography. Using a process known today as broadband fluorescence infrared photography, or NIR photography, Najib and the team at the museum produced over 1,750 photographic plates of the scrolls and fragments.Dorrell, Peter G. Photography in Archaeology and Conservation 2nd Edition. 1994 The photographs were taken with the scrolls laid out on animal skin, using large format film, which caused the text to stand out, making the plates especially useful for assembling fragments. These are the earliest photographs of the museum's collection, which was the most complete in the world at the time, and they recorded the fragments and scrolls before their further decay in storage, so they are often considered the best recorded copies of the scrolls.

Israel Antiquities Authority and NASA digital infrared imaging (1993–2012)

Beginning in 1993, the United States National Aeronautics and Space Administration used digital infrared imaging technology to produce photographs of Dead Sea Scrolls fragments. In partnership with the Ancient Biblical Manuscript Center and West Semitic Research, NASA's Jet Propulsion Laboratory successfully worked to expand on the use of infrared photography previously used to evaluate ancient manuscripts by expanding the range of spectra at which images are photographed. NASA used this multi-spectral imaging technique, adapted from its remote sensing and planetary probes, in order to reveal previously illegible text on fragments of the Dead Sea Scrolls. The process uses a liquid crystal tunable filter in order to photograph the scrolls at specific wavelengths of light and, as a result, image distortion is significantly diminished. This method was used with select fragments of the Dead Sea Scrolls to reveal text and details that cameras that take photographs using a larger light spectrum could not reveal. The camera and digital imaging assembly was developed specifically for the purpose of photographing illegible ancient texts.

On 18 December 2012 the first output of this project was launched together with Google on the dedicated site Deadseascrolls.org.il. The site contains both digitizations of old images taken in the 1950s and about 1000 new images taken with the new NASA technology.

Israel Antiquities Authority and DNA scroll assembly (2006–2020)
Scientists with the Israeli Antiquities Authority have used DNA from the parchment on which the Dead Sea Scrolls fragments were written, in concert with infrared digital photography, to assist in the reassembly of the scrolls. For scrolls written on parchment made from animal hide and papyrus, scientists with the museum are using DNA code to associate fragments with different scrolls and to help scholars determine which scrolls may hold greater significance based on the type of material that was used. In a paper published in 2020 in the journal Cell, researchers from Tel Aviv University have shown that ancient DNA extracted from the ancient scrolls can be used to sort different scroll fragments not only based on the animal species but also based on variations in the nuclear genome of individual fragments. This effort enabled the researchers to match different fragments to each other based on their genetics and separate fragments which were falsely connected in the past.

Israel Museum of Jerusalem and Google digitization project (2011–2016)
In partnership with Google, the Museum of Jerusalem is working to photograph the Dead Sea Scrolls and make them available to the public digitally, although not placing the images in the public domain. The lead photographer of the project, Ardon Bar-Hama, and his team are utilizing the Alpa 12 MAX camera accompanied with a Leaf Aptus-II back in order to produce ultra-high resolution digital images of the scrolls and fragments. With photos taken at 1,200 megapixels, the results are digital images that can be used to distinguish details that are invisible to the naked eye. In order to minimize damage to the scrolls and fragments, photographers are using a 1/4000th of a second exposure time and UV-protected flash tubes. The digital photography project was estimated in 2011 to cost approximately 3.5 million U.S. dollars.

Scholarly examination

After most of the scrolls and fragments were moved to the Palestine Archaeological Museum in 1953, scholars began to assemble them and log them for translation and study in a room that became known as the "scrollery".

The text of the Dead Sea Scrolls is written in four different languages: Hebrew, Aramaic, Greek, and Nabataean.

Publication
Physical publication and controversy

Some of the fragments and scrolls were published early. Most of the longer, more complete scrolls were published soon after their discovery. All the writings in Cave 1 appeared in print between 1950 and 1956; those from eight other caves were released in 1963; and 1965 saw the publication of the Psalms Scroll from Cave 11. Their translations into English soon followed.

 Controversy 
Publication of the scrolls has taken many decades, and delays have been a source of academic controversy. The scrolls were controlled by a small group of scholars headed by John Strugnell, while a majority of scholars had access neither to the scrolls nor even to photographs of the text. Scholars such as Norman Golb, publishers and writers such as Hershel Shanks, and many others argued for decades for publishing the texts, so that they become available to researchers. This controversy only ended in 1991, when the Biblical Archaeology Society was able to publish the "Facsimile Edition of the Dead Sea Scrolls", after an intervention of the Israeli government and the Israeli Antiquities Authority (IAA). In 1991 Emanuel Tov was appointed as the chairman of the Dead Sea Scrolls Foundation, and publication of the scrolls followed in the same year.

Physical description
The majority of the scrolls consist of tiny, brittle fragments, which were published at a pace considered by many to be excessively slow. During early assembly and translation work by scholars through the Rockefeller Museum from the 1950s through the 1960s, access to the unpublished documents was limited to the editorial committee.

Discoveries in the Judaean Desert (1955–2009)
The content of the scrolls was published in a 40-volume series by Oxford University Press between 1955 and 2009 known as Discoveries in the Judaean Desert. In 1952 the Jordanian Department of Antiquities assembled a team of scholars to begin examining, assembling, and translating the scrolls with the intent of publishing them. The initial publication, assembled by Dominique Barthélemy and Józef Milik, was published as Qumran Cave 1 in 1955. After a series of other publications in the late 1980s and early 1990s and with the appointment of the respected Dutch-Israeli textual scholar Emanuel Tov as editor-in-chief of the Dead Sea Scrolls Publication Project in 1990 publication of the scrolls accelerated. Tov's team had published five volumes covering the Cave 4 documents by 1995. Between 1990 and 2009, Tov helped the team produce 32 volumes. The final volume, Volume XL, was published in 2009.

A Preliminary Edition of the Unpublished Dead Sea Scrolls (1991)
In 1991, researchers at Hebrew Union College in Cincinnati, Ohio, Ben Zion Wacholder and Martin Abegg, announced the creation of a computer program that used previously published scrolls to reconstruct the unpublished texts. Officials at the Huntington Library in San Marino, California, led by Head Librarian William Andrew Moffett, announced that they would allow researchers unrestricted access to the library's complete set of photographs of the scrolls. In the fall of that year, Wacholder published 17 documents that had been reconstructed in 1988 from a concordance and had come into the hands of scholars outside of the International Team; in the same month, there occurred the discovery and publication of a complete set of facsimiles of the Cave 4 materials at the Huntington Library. Thereafter, the officials of the Israel Antiquities Authority agreed to lift their long-standing restrictions on the use of the scrolls.

A Facsimile Edition of the Dead Sea Scrolls (1991)
After further delays, attorney William John Cox undertook representation of an "undisclosed client", who had provided a complete set of the unpublished photographs, and contracted for their publication. Professors Robert Eisenman and James Robinson indexed the photographs and wrote an introduction to A Facsimile Edition of the Dead Sea Scrolls, which was published by the Biblical Archaeology Society in 1991. Following the publication of the Facsimile Edition, Professor Elisha Qimron sued Hershel Shanks, Eisenman, Robinson and the Biblical Archaeology Society for copyright infringement for publishing, without authorization or attribution, his decipherment of one of the scrolls, MMT. The District Court of Jerusalem found in favor of Qimron in September 1993. The Court issued a restraining order, which prohibited the publication of the deciphered text, and ordered defendants to pay Qimron NIS 100,000 for infringing his copyright and the right of attribution. Defendants appealed the Supreme Court of Israel, which approved the District Court's decision, in August 2000. The Supreme Court further ordered that the defendants hand over to Qimron all the infringing copies. The decision met Israeli and international criticism from copyright law scholars.Roberta Rosenthal Kwall, "Inspiration and Innovation: The Intrinsic Dimension of the Artistic Soul" 81 Notre Dame L. Rev.. 1945 (2006)Urszula Tempska, "Originality after the Dead Sea Scrolls Decision: Implications for the American Law of Copyright", 6 Marq. Intell. Prop. L. Rev. 119 (2002)

The Facsimile Edition by Facsimile Editions Ltd, London, England (2007–2008)
In November 2007 the Dead Sea Scrolls Foundation commissioned the London publisher, Facsimile Editions Limited, to produce a facsimile edition of The Great Isaiah Scroll (1QIsa), The Order of the Community (1QS), and The Pesher to Habakkuk (1QpHab). The facsimile was produced from 1948 photographs, and so more faithfully represents the condition of the Isaiah Scroll at the time of its discovery than does the current condition of the real Isaiah Scroll.

Of the first three facsimile sets, one was exhibited at the Early Christianity and the Dead Sea Scrolls exhibition in Seoul, South Korea, and a second set was purchased by the British Library in London. A further 46 sets including facsimiles of three fragments from Cave 4 (now in the collection of the National Archaeological Museum in Amman, Jordan) Testimonia (4Q175), Pesher Isaiahb (4Q162) and Qohelet (4Q109) were announced in May 2009. The edition is strictly limited to 49 numbered sets of these reproductions on either specially prepared parchment paper or real parchment. The complete facsimile set (three scrolls including the Isaiah Scroll and the three Jordanian fragments) can be purchased for $60,000.

The facsimiles have since been exhibited in Qumrân. Le secret des manuscrits de la mer Morte at the Bibliothèque Nationale, Paris, France (2010) and Verbum Domini at the Vatican, Rome, Italy (2012).

Digital publication
Olive Tree Bible Software (2000–2011)
The text of nearly all of the non-biblical scrolls has been recorded and tagged for morphology by Dr. Martin Abegg, Jr., the Ben Zion Wacholder Professor of Dead Sea Scroll Studies at Trinity Western University located in Langley, British Columbia, Canada. It is available on handheld devices through Olive Tree Bible Software - BibleReader, on Macs and Windows via emulator through Accordance with a comprehensive set of cross references, and on Windows through Logos Bible Software and BibleWorks.

The Dead Sea Scrolls Reader (2005)
The text of almost all of the non-biblical texts from the Dead Sea Scrolls was released on CD-ROM by publisher E.J. Brill in 2005. The 2,400 page, 6-volume series, was assembled by an editorial team led by Donald W. Parry and Emanuel Tov. Unlike the text translations in the physical publication, Discoveries in the Judaean Desert, the texts are sorted by genres that include religious law, parabiblical texts, calendrical and sapiental texts, and poetic and liturgical works.

The Leon Levy Dead Sea Scrolls Digital Library
High-resolution images, including infrared photographs, of some of the Dead Sea Scrolls are now available online on two dedicated websites.

On 19 October 2010, it was announced that Israeli Antiquities Authority would scan the documents using multi-spectral imaging technology developed by NASA to produce high-resolution images of the texts, and then, through a partnership with Google, make them available online free of charge, on a searchable database and complemented by translation and other scholarly tools.

 Related findings 
Two silver scroll-shaped amulets dated  and containing portions of the Priestly Blessing from the Book of Numbers were excavated in Jerusalem at Ketef Hinnom.

On 25 September 2011 the Israel Museum Digital Dead Sea Scrolls site went online. It gives users access to searchable, high-resolution images of the scrolls, as well as short explanatory videos and background information on the texts and their history. , five complete scrolls from the Israel Museum have been digitized for the project and are now accessible online: the Great Isaiah Scroll, the Community Rule Scroll, the Commentary on Habakkuk Scroll, the Temple Scroll, and the War Scroll.

Biblical significance

Before the discovery of the Dead Sea Scrolls, the oldest Hebrew-language manuscripts of the Bible were Masoretic texts dating to the 10th century CE, such as the Aleppo Codex. Today, the oldest known extant manuscripts of the Masoretic Text date from approximately the 9th century. The biblical manuscripts found among the Dead Sea Scrolls push that date back a full thousand years, to the 2nd century BCE. This was a significant discovery for Old Testament scholars who anticipated that the Dead Sea Scrolls would either affirm or repudiate the reliability of textual transmission from the original texts to the oldest Masoretic texts at hand. The discovery demonstrated the unusual accuracy of transmission over a thousand-year period, rendering it reasonable to believe that current Old Testament texts are reliable copies of the original works.

According to The Dead Sea Scrolls by Hebrew scholar Millar Burrows

Of the 166 words in Isaiah 53, there are only seventeen letters in question. Ten of these letters are simply a matter of spelling, which does not affect the sense. Four more letters are minor stylistic changes, such as conjunctions. The remaining three letters comprise the word "light," which is added in verse 11, and does not affect the meaning greatly.

It is important to note that differences were found among fragments of texts. According to The Oxford Companion to Archaeology:

Biblical books found
There are 225 biblical texts included in the Dead Sea Scroll documents, or around 22% of the total, and with deuterocanonical books the number increases to 235.Abegg et al. "The Dead Sea Scrolls Bible: The Oldest Known Bible Translated for the First Time into English." 1999. The Dead Sea Scrolls contain parts of all but one of the books of the Tanakh of the Hebrew Bible and the Old Testament protocanon. They also include four of the deuterocanonical books included in Catholic and Eastern Orthodox Bibles: Tobit, Sirach, Baruch 6 (also known as the Letter or Epistle of Jeremiah), and Psalm 151. The Book of Esther has not yet been found and scholars believe Esther is missing because, as a Jew, her marriage to a Persian king may have been looked down upon by the inhabitants of Qumran, or because the book has the Purim festival which is not included in the Qumran calendar. Listed below are the most represented books, along with the deuterocanonicals, of the Bible found among the Dead Sea Scrolls, including the number of translatable Dead Sea texts that represent a copy of scripture from each biblical book:E. Tov, "Joshua, Book of," in Encyclopedia of the Dead Sea Scrolls (eds. L. H. Schiffman and J. C. VanderKam; 2 vols.; New York: OUP, 2000) 1: 431

Non-biblical books
The majority of the texts found among the Dead Sea Scrolls are non-biblical in nature and were thought to be insignificant for understanding the composition or canonization of the biblical books, but a consensus has emerged which sees many of these works as being collected by the Essene community instead of being composed by them. Scholars now recognize that some of these works were composed earlier than the Essene period, when some of the biblical books were still being written or redacted into their final form.

Museum exhibitions and displays

Small portions of the Dead Sea Scrolls collections have been put on temporary display in exhibitions at museums and public venues around the world. The majority of these exhibitions took place in 1965 in the United States and the United Kingdom and from 1993 to 2011 in locations around the world. Many of the exhibitions were co-sponsored by either the Jordanian government (pre-1967) or the Israeli government (post-1967). Exhibitions were discontinued after 1965 due to the Six-Day War conflicts and have slowed down in post-2011 as the Israeli Antiquities Authority works to digitize the scrolls and place them in permanent cold storage.

The majority of the Dead Sea Scrolls collection was moved to Jerusalem's Shrine of the Book (a part of the Israel Museum) after the building's completion in April 1965. The museum falls under the auspices of the Israel Antiquities Authority, an official agency of the Israeli government. The permanent Dead Sea Scrolls exhibition at the museum features a reproduction of the Great Isaiah Scroll, surrounded by reproductions of other fragments that include Community Rule, the War Scroll, and the Thanksgiving Psalms Scroll.

Some of the Dead Sea Scrolls collection held by the Jordanian government prior to 1967 were stored in Amman rather than at the Palestine Archaeological Museum in East Jerusalem. As a consequence, that part of the collection remained in Jordanian hands under their Department of Antiquities. Since 2013, the part of the collection held by Jordan has been on display at The Jordan Museum in Amman. Among the display items are artifacts from the Qumran site and the Copper Scroll.

Ownership

Upon their discovery in 1947 in what was then Mandatory Palestine, the Dead Sea Scrolls were first moved to the Palestine Archaeological Museum. The museum was managed by Jordan, along with all of East Jerusalem, from 1948 until 1967.

After Israel's occupation of the West Bank, including East Jerusalem, in 1967, the Palestine Archeological Museum (soon renamed the Rockefeller Archeological Museum) fell under Israeli administration, and the Dead Sea Scrolls collection held there was moved to the "Shrine of the Book", in the Israel Museum in West Jerusalem. The Israel Museum falls under the auspices of the Israel Antiquities Authority, an official agency of the Israeli government. The permanent Dead Sea Scrolls exhibition at the museum features a reproduction of the Great Isaiah Scroll, surrounded by reproductions of other fragments that include Community Rule, the War Scroll, and the Thanksgiving Psalms Scroll.

Some of the Dead Sea Scrolls collection held by the Jordanian government prior to 1967 were stored in Amman rather than at the Palestine Archaeological Museum in East Jerusalem. As a consequence, that part of the collection remained in Jordanian hands, under their Department of Antiquities. Since 2013, the part of the collection held by Jordan has been on display at The Jordan Museum in Amman. Among the display items are artifacts from the Qumran site and the Copper Scroll.

Israel claims ownership of the Dead Sea Scrolls collection currently housed at the Israel Museum. This claimed ownership is contested by both Jordan and the Palestinian Authority.

Forgeries and claimed private ownership
Arrangements with the Bedouin left the scrolls in the hands of a third party until a profitable sale of them could be negotiated. That third party, George Isha'ya, was a member of the Syriac Orthodox Church, who soon contacted St Mark's Monastery in the hope of getting an appraisal of the nature of the texts. News of the find then reached Metropolitan Athanasius Yeshue Samuel, better known as Mar Samuel. After examining the scrolls and suspecting their antiquity, Mar Samuel expressed an interest in purchasing them. Four scrolls found their way into his hands: the Isaiah Scroll (1QIsaa), the Community Rule, the Habakkuk Pesher (a commentary on the book of Habakkuk), and the Genesis Apocryphon. More scrolls soon surfaced in the antiquities market, and Professor Eleazer Sukenik and Professor Benjamin Mazar, archaeologists at Hebrew University, soon found themselves in possession of three, The War Scroll, Thanksgiving Hymns, and another, more fragmented, Isaiah Scroll (1QIsab).

Four of the Dead Sea Scrolls eventually went up for sale in an advertisement on 1 June 1954, The Wall Street Journal. On 1 July 1954, the scrolls, after delicate negotiations and accompanied by three people including the Metropolitan, arrived at the Waldorf-Astoria Hotel in New York. They were purchased by Professor Mazar and the son of Professor Sukenik, Yigael Yadin, for $250,000 (approximately $ in  dollars), and brought to Jerusalem.

Since 2002, many forgeries of Dead Sea Scrolls have appeared on black markets.

In 2020, the Museum of the Bible in the United States (also known as Green Collection – Green Family) reported that all 16 purported "Dead Sea Scroll fragments" they had acquired between 2009 and 2014 were in fact modern forgeries.

 Ownership disputes 
The official ownership of the Dead Sea Scrolls is disputed among Jordan, Israel, and the Palestinian Authority. The debate over the Dead Sea Scrolls stems from a more general Israeli–Palestinian conflict over land and state recognition.

Copyright disputes

There are three types of documents relating to the Dead Sea Scrolls in which copyright status can be considered ambiguous; the documents themselves, images taken of the documents, and reproductions of the documents. This ambiguity arises from differences in copyright law across different countries and the variable interpretation of such law.

In 1992 a copyright case Qimron v. Shanks was brought before the Israeli District court by scholar Elisha Qimron against Hershel Shanks of the Biblical Archaeology Society for violations of United States copyright law regarding his publishing of reconstructions of Dead Sea Scroll texts done by Qimron in A Facsimile Edition of the Dead Sea Scrolls which were included without his permission. Qimron's suit against the Biblical Archaeology Society was done on the grounds that the research they had published was his intellectual property as he had reconstructed about 40% of the published text. In 1993, the district court Judge Dalia Dorner ruled for the plaintiff, Elisha Qimron, in context of both United States and Israeli copyright law and granted the highest compensation allowed by law for aggravation in compensation against Hershel Shanks and others. In an appeal in 2000 in front of Judge Aharon Barak, the verdict was upheld in Israeli Supreme Court in Qimron's favor. The court case established the two main principles from which facsimiles are examined under copyright law of the United States and Israel: authorship and originality.

The court's ruling not only affirms that the "deciphered text" of the scrolls can fall under copyright of individuals or groups, but makes it clear that the Dead Sea Scrolls themselves do not fall under this copyright law and scholars have a degree of, in the words of U.S. copyright law professor David Nimmer, "freedom" in access. Nimmer has shown how this freedom was in the theory of law applicable, but how it did not exist in reality as the Israeli Antiquities Authority tightly controlled access to the scrolls and photographs of the scrolls.

See also
 Ancient Hebrew writings
 Book of Mysteries Cairo Geniza
 Jordan Lead Codices
 Ketef Hinnom scrolls (7th/6th century BCE), oldest items containing biblical text (a variation of Numbers 6:24–26 etc.)
 Nag Hammadi library
 Oxyrhynchus Papyri
 Teacher of Righteousness

 Explanatory notes 

 References 
 Citations 

 General and cited sources 
 Books 

 Abegg, Jr., Martin, Peter Flint, and Eugene Ulrich, The Dead Sea Scrolls Bible: The Oldest Known Bible Translated for the First Time into English, San Francisco: Harper, 2002. , (contains the biblical portion of the scrolls)
 Abegg, Jr. Martin, James E. Bowley, Edward M. Cook, Emanuel Tov. The Dead Sea Scrolls Concordance, Vol 1.  Brill Publishing 2003. .
 Allegro, John Marco, The Dead Sea Scrolls and the Christian Myth, Westbridge Books, UK, 1979.
 Berg, Simon. Insights into the Dead Sea Scrolls: A Beginner's Guide, BookSurge Publishing, 2009.
 Boccaccini, Gabriele. Beyond the Essene Hypothesis: The Parting of Ways between Qumran and Enochic Judaism, Grand Rapids: Eerdmans, 1998.
 Burrows, Millar (1955). The Dead Sea Scrolls. New York: Viking. .
 Burrows, Millar (1958). More Light on the Dead Sea Scrolls; New Scrolls and New Interpretations, with Translations of Important Recent Discoveries. New York: Viking.
 Charlesworth, James H. "The Theologies of the Dead Sea Scrolls." pp. xv–xxi in The Faith of Qumran: Theology of the Dead Sea Scrolls. Edited by H. Ringgren. New York: Crossroad, 1995.
 Chernoivanenko, Vitaly. "The Jerusalem Theory of the Dead Sea Scrolls Authorship: Origins, Evolution, and Discussions," in Ukrainian Orientalistics: Special Issue on Jewish Studies, Кyiv: NaUKMA Omeljan Pritsak Center for Oriental Studies, 2011: 9–29.
 Collins, John J., Apocalypticism in the Dead Sea Scrolls, New York: Routledge, 1997.
 Collins, John J., and Craig A. Evans. Christian Beginnings and the Dead Sea Scrolls, Grand Rapids: Baker, 2006.
 Cook, Edward M. (1994). Solving the Mysteries of the Dead Sea Scrolls: New Light on the Bible, Grand Rapids, MI: Zondervan.
 Cross, Frank Moore (1995). The Ancient Library of Qumran, 3rd ed., Minneapolis: Fortress Press. 
 Davies, A. Powell (1956). The Meaning of the Dead Sea Scrolls. Signet.
 Davies, Philip R., George J. Brooke, and Phillip R. Callaway (2002). The Complete World of the Dead Sea Scrolls, London: Thames & Hudson. 
 de Vaux, Roland, Archaeology and the Dead Sea Scrolls (Schweich Lectures of the British Academy, 1959). Oxford: Oxford University Press, 1973.
 Dimant, Devorah, and Uriel Rappaport (eds.), The Dead Sea Scrolls: Forty Years of Research, Leiden and Jerusalem: E.J. Brill, Magnes Press, Yad Izhak Ben-Zvi, 1992.
 Eisenman, Robert H., The Dead Sea Scrolls and the First Christians, Shaftesbury: Element, 1996.
 Eisenman, Robert H., and Michael O. Wise. The Dead Sea Scrolls Uncovered: The First Complete Translation and Interpretation of 50 Key Documents Withheld for Over 35 Years, Shaftesbury: Element, 1992.
 Eisenman, Robert H. and James Robinson, A Facsimile Edition of the Dead Sea Scrolls 2 vol., Washington, D.C.: Biblical Archaeology Society, 1991.
 Fitzmyer, Joseph A., Responses to 101 Questions on the Dead Sea Scrolls, Paulist Press 1992, 
 
 Galor, Katharina, Jean-Baptiste Humbert, and Jürgen Zangenberg. Qumran: The Site of the Dead Sea Scrolls: Archaeological Interpretations and Debates: Proceedings of a Conference held at Brown University, 17–19 November 2002, Edited by Florentino García Martínez, Studies on the Texts of the Desert of Judah 57. Leiden: Brill, 2006.
 García-Martinez, Florentino, The Dead Sea Scrolls Translated: The Qumran Texts in English, (Translated from Spanish into English by Wilfred G. E. Watson) (Leiden: E.J. Brill, 1994).
 García Martínez Florentino, Eibert J.C. Tigchelaar, Editors, The Dead Sea Scrolls Study Edition, Brill, 1999
 Gaster, Theodor H., The Dead Sea Scriptures, Peter Smith Pub Inc., 1976. 
 Golb, Norman, Who Wrote the Dead Sea Scrolls? The Search for the Secret of Qumran, New York: Scribner, 1995.
 Golb, Norman, On the Jerusalem Origin of the Dead Sea Scrolls , University of Chicago Oriental Institute, 5 June 2009.
 Heline, Theodore, Dead Sea Scrolls, New Age Bible & Philosophy Center, 1957, Reprint edition 1987, 
 Hirschfeld, Yizhar, Qumran in Context: Reassessing the Archaeological Evidence, Peabody: Hendrickson Publishers, 2004.
 Israeli, Raphael, Routledge Piracy in Qumran: The Battle over the Scrolls of the Pre-Christ Era], Transaction Publishers: 2008 
 Khabbaz, C., "Les manuscrits de la mer Morte et le secret de leurs auteurs", Beirut, 2006. (Ce livre identifie les auteurs des fameux manuscrits de la mer Morte et dévoile leur secret).
 Magen, Yizhak, and Yuval Peleg, The Qumran Excavations 1993–2004: Preliminary Report, JSP 6 (Jerusalem: Israel Antiquities Authority, 2007) Download 
 Magen, Yizhak, and Yuval Peleg, "Back to Qumran: Ten years of Excavations and Research, 1993–2004," in The Site of the Dead Sea Scrolls: Archaeological Interpretations and Debates (Studies on the Texts of the Desert of Judah 57), Brill, 2006 (pp. 55–116).
 Magness, Jodi, The Archaeology of Qumran and the Dead Sea Scrolls, Grand Rapids: Eerdmans, 2002.
 Maier, Johann, The Temple Scroll, [German edition was 1978], (Sheffield:JSOT Press [Supplement 34], 1985).
 Milik, Józef Tadeusz, Ten Years of Discovery in the Wilderness of Judea, London: SCM, 1959.
 Muro, E. A., "The Greek Fragments of Enoch from Qumran Cave 7 (7Q4, 7Q8, &7Q12 = 7QEn gr = Enoch 103:3–4, 7–8)." Revue de Qumran 18, no. 70 (1997): 307, 12, pl. 1.
 O'Callaghan-Martínez, Josep, Cartas Cristianas Griegas del Siglo V, Barcelona: E. Balmes, 1963.
 Qimron, Elisha, The Hebrew of the Dead Sea Scrolls, Harvard Semitic Studies, 1986. (This is a serious discussion of the Hebrew language of the scrolls.)
 Rengstorf, Karl Heinrich, Hirbet Qumran und die Bibliothek vom Toten Meer, Translated by J. R. Wilkie. Stuttgart: W. Kohlhammer, 1960.
 Roitman, Adolfo, ed. A Day at Qumran: The Dead Sea Sect and Its Scrolls. Jerusalem: The Israel Museum, 1998.
 Sanders, James A., ed. Dead Sea scrolls: The Psalms scroll of Qumrân Cave 11 (11QPsa), (1965) Oxford, Clarendon Press.
 Schiffman, Lawrence H., Reclaiming the Dead Sea Scrolls: their True Meaning for Judaism and Christianity, Anchor Bible Reference Library (Doubleday) 1995, (Schiffman has suggested two plausible theories of origin and identity – a Sadducean splinter group, or perhaps an Essene group with Sadducean roots.) Excerpts of this book can be read at COJS: Dead Sea Scrolls.
 Schiffman, Lawrence H., and James C. VanderKam, eds. Encyclopedia of the Dead Sea Scrolls. 2 vols. New York: Oxford University Press, 1999.
 Shanks, Hershel, The Mystery and Meaning of the Dead Sea Scrolls, Vintage Press 1999,  (recommended introduction to their discovery and history of their scholarship)
 Stegemann, Hartmut. "The Qumran Essenes: Local Members of the Main Jewish Union in Late Second Temple Times." pp. 83–166 in The Madrid Qumran Congress: Proceedings of the International Congress on the Dead Sea Scrolls, Madrid, 18–21 March 1991, Edited by J. Trebolle Barrera and L. Vegas Mountainer. Vol. 11 of Studies on the Texts of the Desert of Judah. Leiden: Brill, 1992.
 Thiede, Carsten Peter, The Dead Sea Scrolls and the Jewish Origins of Christianity, Palgrave 2000, 
 Thiering, Barbara, Jesus the Man, New York: Atria, 2006.
 Thiering, Barbara, Jesus and the Riddle of the Dead Sea Scrolls, New York: HarperCollins, 1992
 VanderKam, James C., The Dead Sea Scrolls Today, Grand Rapids: Eerdmans, 1994.
 Vermes, Geza, The Complete Dead Sea Scrolls in English, London: Penguin, 1998.  (7th ed. 2011 )
 Wise, Michael O., Martin Abegg, Jr., and Edward Cook, The Dead Sea Scrolls: A New Translation, (1996), Harper San Francisco paperback 1999, (contains the non-biblical portion of the scrolls, including fragments)
 Yadin, Yigael. The Temple Scroll: The Hidden Law of the Dead Sea Sect, New York: Random House, 1985.

 Other sources 

 Dead Sea Scrolls Study Vol 1: 1Q1 – 4Q273, Vol. 2: 4Q274 – 11Q31, (compact disc), Logos Research Systems, Inc., (contains the non-biblical portion of the scrolls with Hebrew and Aramaic transcriptions in parallel with English translations)
 Comprehensive Cross Reference interactive module for Dead Sea Scrolls, Josephus, Philo, Nag Hammadi Library, Pseudepigrapha, Old Testament Apocrypha, New Testament Apocrypha, Plato, Pythagoras, Dhammapada, Egyptian Book of the Dead, Tacitus, Talmud, New and Old Testaments, Apostolic and Early Church Fathers 

Further reading
 Harrison, R. K., The Dead Sea Scrolls: An Introduction, in the series The Cloister Library. New York: Harper Torchbooks. 1961. 
 Angela Kim Harkins and Mladen Popoviç, eds. (November 2015). Dead Sea Discoveries''. vol. 22.3: "Religious Experience and the Dead Sea Scrolls".

External links

 Bible Places: Qumran Caves
 Chabad.org: What are the Dead Sea Scrolls?
 The Leon Levy Dead Sea Scrolls Digital Library
 Israel Museum, Jerusalem: Shrine of the Book – Dead Sea Scrolls
 My Jewish Learning: Dead Sea Scrolls

 
1946 archaeological discoveries
1st-century BC biblical manuscripts
1st-century biblical manuscripts
2nd-century BC biblical manuscripts
3rd-century BC biblical manuscripts
Ancient Hebrew texts
Ancient Jewish history
Archaeological corpora
Archaeological discoveries in Israel
Archaeological discoveries in the West Bank
Archaeology of Palestine (region)
Collections of the Israel Museum
Essene texts
Hebrew manuscripts
History of the West Bank
Israel Antiquities Authority
Judaean Desert
Judea